The 2009 Korean League Cup, also known as the Peace Cup Korea 2009, was the 22nd competition of the Korean League Cup. It began on 25 March 2009, and ended on 16 September 2009.

Group stage
All K League clubs excluding participating clubs of the 2009 AFC Champions League entered the group stage. Clubs ranked odd-numbered places in the 2008 K League were assigned to the Group A, and even-numbered clubs were assigned to the Group B. The fledgling club Gangwon FC entered the Group A. The top two clubs of each group qualified for the knockout stage.

Group A

Group B

Knockout stage

Teams

Bracket

Goalscorers

Awards

Source:

See also
2009 in South Korean football
2009 K League
2009 Korean FA Cup

References

External links
Official website 
 Review at K League 

2009
2009 domestic association football cups
2009 in South Korean football
Peace Cup Korea 2009